Canaan is a small village in southwestern Tobago situated about 5 minutes (by car) from Arthur Napoleon Raymond Robinson International Airport (formerly Crown Point Airport), and the popular beaches of Store Bay and Pigeon Point. It is between the towns of Bon Accord and Lowlands. It boasts amenities such as one of the largest supermarkets in Tobago (Penny Savers), one of the newest branches of the First Citizens Bank, a popular bakery, car dealership, and a noticeable number of  other shops. Canaan is the birthplace of footballer Dwight Yorke.

Canaan is mainly a residential area, and is part of the developing Canaan-BonAccord region of Tobago which benefits from proximity to the CrownPoint airport and the main thoroughfare: Milford Road which connects to the capital Scarborough.

The town's roads are arranged in a regular grid found on the north side of Milford Road. Most streets run N-S and connect Milford road to its parallel: Guy Street.

Climate

References

Populated places in Tobago
Villages in Trinidad and Tobago